Earley is a town in England.

Earley may also refer to:
Earley (surname), a list of people with the surname Earley
 Earley (given name), a variant of the given name Earlene
Earley Lake, a lake in Minnesota
Earley parser, an algorithm
Earley and Company, a stained glass manufacturer